Harriet Austin may refer to:
 Harriet Austin (rower) (born 1988), New Zealand rower
 Harriet Bunker Austin (1843–1904), American author
 Harriet N. Austin (1826–1891), American physician